The Mao Zedong Statue is a marble sculpture located in Tianfu Square, Chengdu, Sichuan, China. The monument stands 30 m (98.4 ft) tall and depicts Mao Zedong with an outstretched arm. Before 1967, the site was occupied by an ancient palace from the Shu Kingdom of ancient Sichuan. The palace was destroyed by Red Guards and the moat around it filled in to make an air raid shelter in 1967.

See also
 List of tallest statues

References

1968 sculptures
Buildings and structures in Chengdu
Colossal statues in China
Marble sculptures in China
Monuments and memorials in China
Outdoor sculptures in China
Statues of Mao Zedong
Stone sculptures in China
Tourist attractions in Chengdu